Hwa-young is a Korean feminine given name. Its meaning depends on the hanja used to write each syllable of the name. There are 15 hanja with the reading "hwa" and 34 hanja with the reading "young" on the South Korean government's official list of hanja which may be registered for use in given names.

People with this name include:
Lee Hwa-young (fencer), South Korean fencer, bronze medalist in fencing at the 1994 Asian Games
Lim Hwa-young (born 1984), South Korean actress
Ryu Hwa-young (born 1993), South Korean singer, former member of T-ara
Lee Hwa-young (born 1996), South Korean singer, former member of Boys24/Unit Sky

Fictional characters with this name include:
Hwa-yeong, the protagonist of 1986 South Korean film Gilsoddeum

References

Korean feminine given names